The Spain men's national squash team represents Spain in international squash team competitions, and is governed by Spanish Squash Federation.

Current team
 Borja Golán
 Iker Pajares Bernabeu
 Edmon Lopez
 Carlos Cornes Ribadas
 Bernat Jaume

Results

World Team Squash Championships

European Squash Team Championships

See also 
 Spanish Squash Federation
 Spain women's national squash team
 World Team Squash Championships

References 

Squash teams
Men's national squash teams
Squash
Men's sport in Spain
Squash in Spain